Albert Subirats Altes (born September 25, 1986) is an Olympic and national record holding swimmer from Venezuela. He represented his homeland at the 2004, 2008 and 2012 Olympics. At the 2007 World Championships, Subirats won Venezuela's first (long course) World Championships medal.

Collegiately, he attended the University of Arizona in the United States, where he swam for the Arizona Wildcats swimming and diving team from 2004 to 2007. While at Arizona, he was a 3-time individual NCAA champion, winning the 100 yd fly his junior and senior years (2006, 2007) and the 100 back (2006).

As of June 2009, he holds the Venezuelan records in the 50 m and 100 m freestyle,  50 m and 100 m backstroke and 50 & 100 m butterfly (long course) and was part of the 4 × 100 m freestyle and 4 × 100 m medley teams that hold those record.  In the short course, he holds the 50 m backstroke and 50 m and 100 m butterfly records.  He also holds the South American long course 100 m butterfly record, and the short course 50 m backstroke record.

At the 2006 Central American and Caribbean Games, he set a Games Record in winning the men's 100 m freestyle (49.55); bettering the record of 50.00 set by fellow Venezuelan Francisco Sánchez on August 11, 1998, at the 1998 Games in Maracaibo.

See also
List of South American records in swimming

References

1986 births
Living people
Sportspeople from Valencia, Venezuela
Venezuelan male freestyle swimmers
Arizona Wildcats men's swimmers
Olympic swimmers of Venezuela
Swimmers at the 2004 Summer Olympics
Swimmers at the 2008 Summer Olympics
Swimmers at the 2012 Summer Olympics
Swimmers at the 2016 Summer Olympics
Swimmers at the 2007 Pan American Games
Swimmers at the 2011 Pan American Games
Swimmers at the 2015 Pan American Games
World Aquatics Championships medalists in swimming
Medalists at the FINA World Swimming Championships (25 m)
Pan American Games gold medalists for Venezuela
Pan American Games bronze medalists for Venezuela
Pan American Games medalists in swimming
Central American and Caribbean Games gold medalists for Venezuela
Central American and Caribbean Games silver medalists for Venezuela
Central American and Caribbean Games bronze medalists for Venezuela
Competitors at the 2006 Central American and Caribbean Games
Competitors at the 2010 Central American and Caribbean Games
Competitors at the 2014 Central American and Caribbean Games
South American Games gold medalists for Venezuela
South American Games silver medalists for Venezuela
South American Games bronze medalists for Venezuela
South American Games medalists in swimming
Competitors at the 2002 South American Games
Competitors at the 2010 South American Games
Competitors at the 2014 South American Games
Central American and Caribbean Games medalists in swimming
Medalists at the 2007 Pan American Games
Medalists at the 2011 Pan American Games
20th-century Venezuelan people
21st-century Venezuelan people